Natalie Gumede (born 20 March 1984) is an English actress. She is known for playing Kirsty Soames in the ITV soap opera, Coronation Street, from 2011 to 2013. She previously played China in BBC Three comedy show Ideal. She has also appeared in The Persuasionists, Emmerdale and Doctor Who among other television shows. Gumede was also runner-up in the 2013 series of Strictly Come Dancing on BBC One. From 2017 to 2019, Gumede began appearing in Netflix original Free Rein as Maggie Steel Phillips.

Early life
Gumede was born in Burnley, Lancashire and lived in Colne during her early life, attending first Christ Church C of E Primary School and then Park High School. Her father is Zimbabwean and her mother is English. Her grandfather Josiah Gumede was the only President of the short-lived Zimbabwe Rhodesia. At the age of 11 while attending Pendle Hippodrome Youth Theatre, she was picked by BBC producers to help present the north-west regional insert for Children in Need in 1995.
She attended the London Italia Conti Academy of Theatre Arts.

Career
From 2004 until 2007, Gumede played China in the dark-comedy sitcom series, Ideal, who along with her friend Asia (Rebecca Atkinson), was one of Moz's regular clients. Her character featured in the pilot episode, and was a regular in the first three series. In 2008, she featured in her first full-length film, Clubbed, a British drama about a 1980s factory worker who takes up a job as a club doorman. In 2005, Gumede made a guest appearance in the ITV soap opera, Emmerdale, portraying Tania Coles. In 2010, Gumede featured in the sitcom The Persuasionists, broadcast on BBC Two, set in the world of advertising, starring Iain Lee, Simon Farnaby, Adam Buxton, Jarred Christmas and Daisy Haggard.

In September 2011, Gumede made her first appearance in the ITV soap opera, Coronation Street, portraying Kirsty Soames, who became the domestic abusive love interest to mechanic Tyrone Dobbs (Alan Halsall). She had previously tried out for the part of Kelly Crabtree, but lost out to Tupele Dorgu. For her portrayal of the character, Gumede had received the Best Newcomer accolade at the 2012 British Soap Awards. She was later nominated for Best Soap Newcomer at the TV Choice Awards and voted Most Popular Newcomer during the 18th National Television Awards. In Digital Spy's end of year reader poll, Kirsty's domestic abuse storyline with on-screen boyfriend Tyrone won Best Storyline with 28.3% of the vote. On 21 February 2013, it was announced that she would leave the soap after a year-and-a-half, and departed when her character, Kirsty, went to prison on 3 April 2013. In June 2021, her character was revealed to have died from an aneurysm.

In 2015, she played the role of Bella in the ITV series Jekyll & Hyde.

Strictly Come Dancing

In 2013, Gumede was a runner-up on the eleventh series of Strictly Come Dancing. Her professional partner was the eighth series champion, Artem Chigvintsev. They quickly became the early favourites for the title after a strong start. In the Final, she lost out to Abbey Clancy & Aljaz Skorjanec and came Joint second along with Susanna Reid & Kevin Clifton.

Filmography

Advertisements

Awards and nominations

References

External links
 

Living people
English television actresses
Alumni of the Italia Conti Academy of Theatre Arts
People from Burnley
People from Colne
English female dancers
Black British actresses
English people of Zimbabwean descent
English stage actresses
English film actresses
English video game actresses
20th-century English actresses
21st-century English actresses
English soap opera actresses
Actresses from Lancashire
1984 births